Native Girls Code (NGC) is a Seattle-based program that focuses on providing computer coding skills with grounding in traditional Indigenous knowledge for Native American girls aged 12 to 18 through workshops, coaching, teaching and role modeling. 

Native Girls Code is organized by the nonprofit organization Na'ah Illahee Fund (Mother Earth in the Chinook language), in partnership with University of Washington Information School Digital Youth Lab and the Washington NASA Space Consortium, as a way to support and perpetuate traditional knowledge, build leadership of women and encourage greater participation of Native American students in STEM fields.

The program was designed specifically to give Native girls from tribes throughout the United States a place to develop a strong foundation in Native culture, Native science, and build the skills needed to use modern computer technologies, resulting in the creation of websites, online games and virtual worlds. Leaders hope Native Girls Code will enrich both the girls and their communities.

Awards and grants 
In 2016 NGC was awarded a grant through the City of Seattle's Technology Matching Fund, aimed at increasing digital equity among underrepresented Seattle citizens. Google has been a major funder of the program and Facebook has donated laptops and filming equipment to NGC.

See also 
 Girls Who Code
 Black Girls Code
 I Look Like an Engineer

References 

Organizations for women in science and technology
Computer science education
Women in computing
Native American women's organizations
Native Americans in Washington (state)
Organizations based in Seattle
Native American scientists
Native American women scientists